College Hill High School may refer to:
 College Hill High School (Cleveland, Tennessee), Cleveland, Tennessee
 College Hill High School (Corvallis, Oregon), Corvallis, Oregon; NRHP-listed

See also 
 North College Hill High School, North College Hill, Ohio